The 2015 Sparkassen ATP Challenger was a professional tennis tournament played on indoor hard courts in Ortisei, Italy between 9 and 15 November 2015. It was the sixth edition of the tournament which was part of the 2015 ATP Challenger Tour.

Singles main-draw entrants

Seeds

 1 Rankings are as of November 2, 2015.

Other entrants
The following players received wildcards into the singles main draw:
  Matteo Berrettini
  Edoardo Eremin
  Lorenzo Sonego
  Dmitry Tursunov

The following players received entry from the qualifying draw:
  Viktor Galović 
  Kevin Krawietz 
  Nikola Mektić
  Maximilian Neuchrist

Champions

Singles

 Ričardas Berankis def.  Rajeev Ram 7–6(7–3), 6–4

Doubles

 Maximilian Neuchrist /  Tristan-Samuel Weissborn def.  Nikola Mektic /  Antonio Sancic 7–6(9–7), 6–3

External links
Official Website

Sparkassen ATP Challenger
Internazionali Tennis Val Gardena Südtirol
2015 in Italian tennis